Francisco Scaramanga is a fictional character and one of the main antagonists in the James Bond novel and film version of The Man with the Golden Gun. Scaramanga is an assassin who kills with his signature weapon, a pistol made of solid gold. In the novel, the character is nicknamed "Pistols" Scaramanga and is also called "Paco" (a Spanish diminutive of Francisco). In the film, the character was played by Christopher Lee (the real-life step-cousin of James Bond creator Ian Fleming).

As with another of James Bond's nemeses, Ernst Stavro Blofeld, Scaramanga's name is believed to have come from a schoolmate of Fleming's, George Ambrosios (Ambrose) Scaramanga.

Novel biography 
Francisco Scaramanga, of Spanish (Catalonia) origin, became a trick shot while a youngster, and he performed in a circus owned by his father Enrico. Francisco also cared for one of the circus elephants, which he stated was his only real friend. When the elephant went on a rampage during the circus visit to Trieste, Scaramanga witnessed a policeman kill him. The enraged boy, who was 16 at the time, retaliated by shooting the policeman through the heart. He then made his way to the United States from Naples, where he found employment as an enforcer for the Spangled Mob, an outfit that plays a role in two other Bond novels: Diamonds Are Forever (where they were the main foe of Agent 007) and Goldfinger as an accomplice to Auric Goldfinger's Operation Grandslam. He posed as a pitboy at the casino of Tiara Hotel in Las Vegas, Nevada, while in fact he was executioner of cheats and other transgressors within and outside the gang. In 1958 he was forced to emigrate from the US because of his gun duel with Ramon "The Rod" Rodriguez, his opposite from the Purple Gang of Detroit (also featured in the novel Goldfinger), in which he killed Ramon, earning $100,000. He spent some time travelling the Caribbean as a representative of Las Vegas interests in real estate and plantation dealing, later switching to Rafael Trujillo of the Dominican Republic and Fulgencio Batista of Cuba where he settled in 1959, in Havana. While remaining a Batista supporter, he started an undercover work for Fidel Castro's party, becoming an "enforcer" for DSS after the Cuban Revolution.

By the time Bond finally encounters him in The Man with the Golden Gun, Scaramanga works as a freelance assassin, often working for Castro's secret police, in addition to being engaged in other criminal enterprises such as drug-running into the United States in partnership with the KGB. MI6 has evaluated Scaramanga as one of the finest shots in the world, and M authorizes Bond to assassinate the gunman — if he can.

Bond catches up with Scaramanga in Jamaica, where Bond pretends to be a freelance security officer named Mark Hazard. and Scaramanga hires him to guard an upcoming meeting of gangsters. During the meeting, a Dutch-born KGB officer named Hendricks reveals Bond's identity, resulting in a shootout between Scaramanga and Bond. Bond wounds him, but before Bond can kill Scaramanaga, Scaramanga shoots Bond with a poisoned bullet from his backup weapon, a golden derringer. Bond returns fire with his .32 Walther PPK pistol, killing Scaramanga instantly; soon thereafter, a policeman finds the nearly dead Bond in time to save him.

In the novel, British intelligence also has an in-depth psychological profile of Scaramanga, which is printed in the book before the mission begins. He is about 35 years old and has light brown eyes. His hair is reddish in a crew-cut with long sideburns. The profile (read by M) also delves into his background and psyche. Among other things, the profile claims that Scaramanga might be a latent homosexual, since he cannot whistle—based on the popular (but unfounded) theory that a man who cannot whistle has homosexual tendencies.

Film biography 
In the feature film The Man with the Golden Gun, Scaramanga is a high-priced assassin, supposedly the best in the world, charging US$1 million per kill. He is best known for being "the man with the golden gun", for using only bullets made of gold in a custom 4.2 mm cartridge with a disassemblable golden handgun made of a gold cigarette case, gold cigarette lighter, gold fountain pen and gold cufflink as the gun's trigger. All of Scaramanga's assassination contracts are arranged through his henchman Nick Nack, which allows Scaramanga to be anonymous. His specialized ammunition is made by a custom gunsmith in Macau, who provides for its delivery to Scaramanga's lover, Andrea Anders, at a casino in Hong Kong.

Francisco Scaramanga was a British national born in a travelling circus. His father was the ringmaster, a former Cuban national and his mother was the snake charmer. By age 10, Francisco was part of the circus as a trick-shot pistol marksman. At age 15, he became an international assassin-for-hire. He was recruited some years later by the KGB while living in Ipanema, in Rio de Janeiro, Brazil; and trained in Eastern Europe where for many years he was basically just another "overworked and underpaid assassin" for the KGB. He quit the KGB in the late 1950s, becoming an independent hitman-for hire. No photographs of him exist, but he has an unusual anatomy: a third nipple. This information later comes in handy to Bond, who uses Scaramanga's anonymity and only known physical feature to get into contact with Scaramanga's current employer, the crime lord Hai-Fat—though Scaramanga is already at Hai-Fat's estate, and Hai-Fat quickly guesses who Bond really is.

Later in the film, Scaramanga reveals to Bond that as a boy living in the travelling circus, he shot and killed an abusive animal trainer for killing an elephant that he had befriended—and discovered that he "enjoyed killing people". Scaramanga also demonstrates his marksmanship to Bond by using a Colt Single Action Army to shoot the cork off a bottle of champagne from long range (Scaramanga's golden gun in the novel is a gold-plated Single Action Army), later dismissing it as a toy.

Scaramanga lives very well, drawing from the exorbitant sums of money he charges to carry out his assassinations. His home is on his own personal island somewhere off the coast of southeastern China—paying for lease of the island and protection through assassinations ('favours') for the Chinese. Despite his assertion that "science was never [his] strong point," the island utilizes many aspects of modern technology, including its own self-sufficient solar power plant. In addition to the power plant, Scaramanga's home also includes a section which is something between a labyrinth and a funhouse, where Scaramanga and his foes duel to the death. Nick Nack hires assassins to kill Scaramanga as a challenge to keep him sharp; moreover Nick Nack will also inherit Scaramanga's entire fortune should one of the assassins succeed. Scaramanga is well aware of and approves of Nick Nack's efforts, and wishes him better luck next time when his hired guns fail. In addition, Scaramanga also has a private junk, which Bond later steals to exit the exploding island.

Scaramanga also uses some of his wealth to finance research and development of technologies that rival those developed by MI6's Q Branch. Such technologies include a car that transforms into an aircraft and a solar-powered laser cannon.

Scaramanga was hired by Hai-Fat to assassinate a British scientist named Gibson, thought to be in possession of solar energy information and technology crucial to solving the energy crisis. Gibson is assassinated and his invention, the solex agitator, is stolen from the crime scene by Nick Nack. The solex agitator is a critical component of Gibson's solar energy device. However, instead of turning the device over to Hai-Fat, Scaramanga instead kills Hai-Fat with his golden gun and takes the device for himself. With it in his possession, it allows for him to sell the device to the highest criminal bidder or use it to power his personal solar energy cannon.

Scaramanga also desires to test his skills against Bond, whom he regards as his only worthy rival. Besides the profit and/or power the solex agitator can give him, Scaramanga's scheme in acquiring the device is also intended to lure Bond to Scaramanga's private island so that the two of them can engage in one final, decisive duel. Although Bond is using his six-bullet .380 Walther PPK pistol while Scaramanga uses the golden gun, Scaramanga states that "[He] only need[s] one"—Bond's superior number of bullets being offset by Scaramanga's advantages of fighting on his own ground.

After taking Bond's fellow MI6 agent Mary Goodnight hostage, Scaramanga lures Bond to his private island, where he reveals his plan and challenges Bond to a duel in his funhouse, after a tense discussion where Scaramanga told Bond they were "the same", enraging Bond to the point where he admitted to Scaramanga that "killing you would be a pleasure". Once in the funhouse, Bond takes the place of a mannequin "James Bond" and tricks Scaramanga into revealing his position to look for Bond with his pistol drawn. Bond shoots Scaramanga in the heart, killing him, and sabotages the solar power plant in order to destroy the island.

Henchmen 
 Nick Nack
 Kra
 Andrea Anders

Hit list 

This is the death toll caused by Scaramanga in the film.
 Rodney, arguably the same Slumber Inc. employee from Diamonds Are Forever
 Dan Gibson, inventor of the solex agitator
 Hai-Fat
 Andrea Anders

In addition, Scaramanga is revealed to have been behind the murder of Bill Fairbanks, MI6 Agent 002, in 1969.

The Golden Gun 

In Ian Fleming's novel, the Golden Gun was a long-barrelled, gold-plated, single-action Colt Peacemaker .45 calibre revolver that fired silver-jacketed bullets with a solid gold core and a cross-cut tip for additional wounding due to the dum-dum effect. However, in the film, it was a single-shot weapon that fired a custom-made  dum-dum bullet made of 23-carat gold with traces of nickel, which Scaramanga carried on his belt buckle. The movie gun could be disassembled and its components disguised as a fountain pen (the barrel), a cigarette lighter (breech), cuff-link (trigger), and a cigarette case (the grip), all gold plated.

Scaramanga used the Golden Gun in numerous assassinations of officials, political enemies, gangsters, and a 00-agent, Bill Fairbanks (002). Scaramanga later used the Golden Gun to kill British scientist Gibson and Scaramanga's own employer, Hai-Fat. But, when Scaramanga was killed and his island destroyed, the Golden Gun was presumably also lost.

The Golden Gun ranked sixth in a 2008 20th Century Fox poll of the most popular film weapons, which surveyed approximately two thousand film fans.

In October 2008, the Golden Gun was stolen from the company Elstree Props which is based in Elstree Studios in Hertfordshire. At the time, the prop was estimated to be worth £80,000.

Video games 
Francisco Scaramanga is a playable character in the multiplayer portions of the 2003 game 007: Nightfire and the 2010 game GoldenEye 007. In the original GoldenEye 007 game, Scaramanga's weapon, the golden gun, was initially added to the "Egyptian" level and multiplayer portion of the game. It is said in the briefing for the "Egyptian" mission that the Golden Gun was stolen from Scaramanga by Baron Samedi. Also, the multiplayer-only fan remake GoldenEye: Source features the weapon as well.

Due to its popularity it was also added into subsequent James Bond games 007: The World is Not Enough, 007: Agent Under Fire, 007: Nightfire, 007: Everything or Nothing, GoldenEye: Rogue Agent, 007: From Russia With Love, 007: Quantum of Solace, GoldenEye 007 and 007 Legends. In The World is Not Enough for the Nintendo 64, the gun must be assembled from the pen, lighter, and case before it could be used. In each of the games (except Everything or Nothing), the golden gun would count for an instant kill, which reflected that Scaramanga never missed, although in the games the player can and because of this, the golden gun is not available in single player mode (except Everything or Nothing) but golden versions of the game's standard weapon(s) are usually available (such as a golden Walther PPK, P99, and a golden rocket launcher). In GoldenEye, the Golden Gun appears in a special mission. In the mission, the Golden Gun is stolen by Baron Samedi, and Bond needs to defeat Samedi and recover the Golden Gun. Although Samedi is not killed (referencing Live and Let Die), Bond escapes with the Golden Gun. Other variants of the Golden Gun also exist, such as the Golden PP7 and the Silver PP7. The Golden Gun also appears in the video game Quantum of Solace. In Quantum of Solace the Golden Gun appears to be based on the design on the gun from the novel (a gold-plated revolver), rather than the design used in the film. It is likely to be based on a Smith & Wesson Model 686 in the game. Perfect Dark, made by GoldenEye developer Rareware, also featured a Golden Gun which would count for an instant kill, this time a customized Colt Python revolver belonging to NSA boss Trent Easton.

Francisco Scaramanga returned for the game GoldenEye: Rogue Agent voiced by Christopher Lee. In the game, he is an ally of Auric Goldfinger. He is the manufacturer of the synthetic eye given to the player (GoldenEye) and makes a virus used against Goldfinger's O.M.E.N. device. The game also features a Multiplayer "Funhouse" level, including the traps that caused Bond to lose most of his bullets such as Al Capone and Cowboy mannequins and an image of Scaramanga. In addition, the level includes a Bond mannequin, whose gun the player can take and use.

Reception 

Francisco Scaramanga was listed at number five in UGO's list of the Top 11 Classy Assassins.

Chris Nashawaty of Entertainment Weekly argues that Scaramanga is the best villain of the Roger Moore James Bond films.

In genetics 
A gene linked to the cause of supernumerary nipples in animals is named the "Scaramanga gene".

References

Works cited 
 
 

!colspan="3" style="background:#C1D8FF;"| Status
|- 
|  style="width:28%; text-align:center;"| Preceded byLouis Jourdan
|  style="width:44%; text-align:center;"| Oldest living Bond villain actorPlayed by Christopher LeeFebruary 14 – June 7, 2015
|  style="width:28%; text-align:center;"| Succeeded byMichael Lonsdale

Bond villains
Fictional assassins
Fictional gunfighters
Male literary villains
Male film villains
The Man with the Golden Gun (film)
Literary characters introduced in 1965
Characters in British novels of the 20th century
Fictional Catalan people
Fictional circus performers
Action film villains
Film supervillains